The Pack River is a river in the North-Central Interior of British Columbia, Canada, flowing north into the Parsnip Reach of Lake Williston.  Part of the Peace River drainage, it was originally a tributary of the Parsnip River before the creation of Lake Williston by the building of WAC Bennett Dam.  It is fed by the McLeod River via McLeod Lake.

See also
List of rivers in British Columbia

References

Rivers of British Columbia
Northern Interior of British Columbia
Cariboo Land District